Kentucky Route 389 (KY 389) is a  state highway in the U.S. state of Kentucky. The highway connects mostly rural areas of Henry and Carroll counties with Lockport, English, and the Carrollton area.

Route description

Henry County
KY 389 begins at an intersection with KY 561 (Gest Road) southwest of Orville, within the southeastern part of Henry County. It travels to the north-northwest and crosses over Woodcocks Branch. It curves to the north-northeast and crosses over Pot Ripple Creek. It curves to the north-northwest and passes Wallace Cemetery. The highway crosses over Sixmile Creek and enters Lockport. At Main Street, KY 389 turns right, to the northeast, and then leaves the community. It curves to the north-northeast and then to the north-northwest. It intersects KY 22 and curves to the northwest. The highway curves to the west and then begins to parallel part of the Kentucky River. It curves to the west-northwest, crosses over Drennon Creek, and intersects the eastern terminus of KY 202 (Drennon Road). At this intersection, KY 389 turns right, to the north-northeast. It curves to the north-northwest and intersects the eastern terminus of KY 574 (Maddox Ridge Road). The highway curves to the west-northwest and crosses over Canes Run. It curves to the northwest and intersects the northern terminus of KY 193 (Port Royal Road). It crosses over Gullion Creek and enters Carroll County.

Carroll County
KY 389 curves to the west-northwest, leaving Kentucky River, and crosses Camp Branch. The highway curves to the northwest and crosses over Lees Creek. The highway curves to the north-northeast and enters English. There, it crosses over some railroad tracks of CSX and curves to the west-northwest. It curves to the northwest, crosses over Mill Creek, intersects the eastern terminus of KY 2997 (Mill Creek Road), and has an interchange with Interstate 71 (I-71). The highway gradually curves to the west-northwest. It then curves to the northwest and crosses over Majors Run before it meets its northern terminus, an intersection with KY 55.

Major intersections

See also

References

0389
Transportation in Henry County, Kentucky
Transportation in Carroll County, Kentucky